World Cup All Stars, founded by Elaine Pascale and Joelle Antico, is home to the 2007, 2008, 2009, 2015, 2017, and 2019 USASF Cheerleading Worlds champions in the Large Senior All Girl division, the World Cup Shooting Stars. In the International Junior All Girl division, the World Cup Starlites are the 2007 and 2008 World Champions.  World Cup was founded in 1994 in Freehold, New Jersey by owner Elaine Pascale and her daughter Joelle Antico. World Cup is one of the most respected all-star programs in the U.S.

History
World Cup grew out of the Pop Warner success of mother–daughter team Elaine Pascale and Joelle Antico.  For many years, Pascale served as coach of the local Pop Warner team that Antico had joined. Eventually, the family moved to Freehold, New Jersey, where Pascale found herself coaching a Pop Warner midget squad. By this time Antico was attending Penn State and would come home on weekends to assist her mother with the team. In 1992, the pair won their first Pop Warner National Championship. The transition from Pop Warner to all stars was not a big leap for Pascale and Antico. After the national win and with the Pop Warner season over, a small group of their students and parents persuaded them to start a competition squad, and the World Cup All Stars were born.

World Cup All Stars officially began in 1994. The first team formed was the Shooting Stars. In 1995 World Cup won its very first national championship.  From that point, the team from World Cup has won numerous national championships from NCA, Spirit Sports, Americheer, WSF and many other companies.  Most recently, winning 2015 IASF Cheerleading Worlds in the Large Senior All Girl division and earning the bronze in the International Junior division.  Both the Large Senior All Girl (Shooting Stars) and International Junior All Girl (Starlites) are back-to-back world champions, winning in both 2007 and 2008.  Also in 2008, World Cup's Large Senior Limited Coed Team (Odyssey) received 3rd place at the Cheerleading Worlds. One of their other well known teams is the Twinkles. They are a youth level 5 team composed of girls ages 8–12 who compete many of the same advanced stunt and tumbling skills as the teams composed of much older athletes. This team has won the NCA National Championship five times recently, in 2011, 2012, 2014, 2015, and 2017. Both in 2012 and 2014, Twinkles finished the season undefeated. Starlites won NCA in 2011, 2014, and 2015. Cosmic Rays won NCA in 2012. The Shooting Stars have won NCA eight times in 2000, 2001, 2002, 2004, 2010, 2011, 2012, and 2016. World Cup has had multiple teams competing in the Cheerleading Worlds for years. In 2014, they have received 4 full paid bids to attend Worlds, one for each of their Worlds eligible teams.
World Cup didn't win any world Championships from 2009-2014, though Shooting Stars still medaled in Large Senior each year. In 2015 Shooting Stars won World Cup's 6th and the team's 4th World Championship title in 6 years in the Large Senior All Girl Level 5 division! This broke a tie the team held with Cheer Extreme Allstars Senior Elite for winning the most times in the division; previously both held 3 titles respectively. In 2014 World Cup Allstars acquired two Pennsylvania based cheer gyms, Keystone Extreme and Rocket Elite, that will henceforth be known as World Cup Genesis and World Cup Phoenix respectively. Both gyms will have Worlds teams this 2014-2015 season.

In 2008, American Cheerleader Magazine ranked World Cup the 2nd "Top All Star Program" in the country.

World Championship Placements 2006-2017 

 

P: Prelims
SF: Semi-Finals

Publicity 
World Cup All Stars has received a considerable amount of publicity, and has been in various media. They were featured in a 2004 and 2005 performance at the Career Transition for Dancers gala, performing alongside Toni Basil, Bette Midler, Patti LaBelle and Liza Minnelli.  As a result of the performance with Toni Basil of her hit "Mickey", she named the Shooting Stars the official Mickey cheerleaders.  They have also been featured in Time Magazine, the New York Times, American Cheerleader Magazine, All-star Cheer Magazine, Inside Cheerleading Magazine, and Cheer Coach & Advisor. In 2009, the Shooting Stars were invited to act as the Glee Cheerleaders at the Glee NYC premiere party.
in 2012, the World Cup Twinkles (Youth Level 5) had their own 1-hour documentary and media companion called Twinkles Chasing Perfection produced by The Star Ledger.

Teams

References

All Star Cheerleading Gyms
Sports in New Jersey
Performing groups established in 1994